James Leslie Miles Fisher (born June 23, 1983) is an American actor, comedian, entrepreneur and musician. He made his debut in the CBS adaptation of the book True Women and had a starring role in the 2000 film Lone Star Struck. In 2001, for his role in his short film Head Shot, Fisher won Best Actor at the International Teen Movie Festival and earned him praise from an article in Newsday.

Fisher appeared as a member of the First Regiment of Virginia Volunteers in the 2003 Civil War film Gods and Generals and parodied actor Tom Cruise in the 2008 film Superhero Movie. He had a recurring role as a rookie police officer in 2008 on the television series The Cleaner, and appeared on Gossip Girl in 2009. On the third season of the television series Mad Men, Fisher portrayed a friend of character Paul Kinsey. In 2011, he played Peter Friedkin in Final Destination 5.

Early life
Fisher is the son of Richard W. Fisher, who was formerly the President of the Federal Reserve Bank of Dallas. His mother, Nancy, served on the national board of the American Film Institute (AFI). His maternal grandfather was Representative James Collins. He was raised in Dallas, Texas, where he attended the St. Mark's School of Texas. After his family moved to Washington, D.C., he attended the St. Albans School.

Fisher graduated from Harvard University, where he was an English major. At Harvard, he was a member of the Porcellian Club, the Hasty Pudding Club and the a cappella singing group the Krokodiloes. Fisher served as the Krokodiloes tour manager, and planned events for the group in 24 countries. He was one of the two students chosen to deliver a Harvard Oration at the 2006 Harvard graduation ceremony. His undergraduate thesis, which won the LeBaron Russell Briggs prize at Harvard, was a "screenplay about a Harvard graduate who avoided the Vietnam draft by teaching in a military prep school".

Career
Fisher appeared in the 1997 CBS television movie adaptation of the book True Women as "Travis", and had a starring role in the 2000 film Lone Star Struck. He received the Best Actor award at the 2001 International Teen Movie Festival (ITMF) in Vaughan, Ontario, Canada, for his own short film titled: Head Shot, which was among 10,000 other entries at the festival.

2000s 
In a 2001 article in Newsday titled: "Miles Fisher, 'It' Boy", columnist Liz Smith referred to Fisher as "wunderkind" and "the next Tom Cruise". Smith's comparison of Fisher to Tom Cruise led to meetings with influential managers and agents, and he signed with the talent agency Endeavor Talent Agency in 2002. Fisher appeared in the 2003 Civil War film Gods and Generals with Robert Duvall. Director Ron Maxwell picked Fisher to portray a heroic member of the First Regiment of Virginia Volunteers in the film; Duvall played Robert E. Lee.

He parodied actor Tom Cruise in the 2008 film Superhero Movie. Fisher's role in the film was popularized on the Internet on sites including Defamer, as well as on television on Entertainment Tonight and the CNN program Showbiz Tonight. The clip of Fisher was viewed on the Internet over 10 million times. A critic for The Baltimore Sun commented that Fisher's appearance in Superhero Movie was the highlight of the film, and wrote: "Actor Miles Fisher replicates Tom Cruise's 'I am the Way, the Thetan, the Light' Scientology recruiting video of last year to hilarious effect." He had a recurring role on A&E Network's television series The Cleaner, portraying a rookie police officer named Kenneth Herman.

Fisher wrote and produced a short film called Heatshot in 2009 with Evan Nichols; the film was selected to be screened at the AFI Dallas International Film Festival. Alan Peppard of The Dallas Morning News reported in March 2009 that Fisher had been cast in the pilot of a television show set in 1983 in Southern California; a spinoff of Gossip Girl. He portrayed a "sleazy" coke dealer on the television series of the same name.

In July 2009, Fisher released an independently produced self-titled EP, Miles Fisher, as well as a music video for his cover of the Talking Heads song "This Must Be The Place." The video is an homage to the 2000 film American Psycho, with Fisher imitating Christian Bale's performance as Patrick Bateman. Students from the American Film Institute helped film the video, which was shot in Los Angeles. The video was posted on YouTube and various other web sites, and received 200,000 hits on Break.com alone within the first 24 hours. Darrell Hartman of Interview called the usage of the Talking Heads song with the American Psycho theme "a brilliant combo", and noted that Fisher "created a viral hit".

2010s 
On the third season of the television series Mad Men, Fisher portrayed Geoff Graves, a friend of character Paul Kinsey. Jessica Gelt of the Los Angeles Times described his character as a "preppy drug dealer". In 2010, Fisher was cast in the film Final Destination 5. In an interview with Collider.com, Fisher revealed that the film was set in a workplace environment, and was a 3-D film. Fisher appeared in Clint Eastwood's J. Edgar Hoover biopic, J. Edgar, playing Agent Garrison, an FBI employee who interviews Leonardo DiCaprio's Hoover throughout the film.

Fisher released the song "New Romance" in video and MP3 form on iTunes and on his personal website on July 19, 2011. The video parodies the Final Destination series and Saved by the Bell. Additionally, he appeared in the fifth film of the Final Destination franchise, playing Peter Friedkin.

On May 22, 2013, a music video for "Finish What We Started" through AboveAverageNetwork on YouTube was posted. The music video featuring Lance Bass has yet to release a single for the song, and a subsequent album has been released, dubbed "Video Music." The music video has been posted to Fisher's personal website.

2020s 
In the early 2020s, Fisher saw a deepfake video by a Belgian visual effects (VFX) artist in which Fisher's eyes were replaced with those of Tom Cruise. Fisher and the VFX artist subsequently collaborated to produce YouTube and TikTok videos of Fisher performing mundane or silly tasks while posing as Cruise, satirizing Cruise's notoriously unapproachable public persona. The videos quickly went viral, collecting millions of views in only a few days. Fisher has not monetized the videos and has deliberately avoided topics of a potentially personal or controversial nature, as he has not received permission from Cruise to use his likeness for profit; Fisher characterized the effort as "good-natured parody" inspired by years of being called the "Tom Cruise guy" due to his similar appearance.

Personal life
In 2014, Miles married Lucette Blodgett, daughter of actor and writer, Michael Blodgett. They were introduced by broadcaster Willow Bay. They had their first child, a daughter, in October 2017.

Filmography

Films

Television

Discography

Albums
 Video Music (2013)

EPs
 Miles Fisher (2009)

Singles
 "This Must Be the Place (Naive Melody)" (2009) (cover of the Talking Heads song)
 "New Romance" (2011)
 "Don't Let Go" (2011)
 "Finish What We Started" (2013) (written by Miles Fisher, Robert Schwartzman, Joe Jonas, John Lloyd Taylor)
 "Finish What We Started (Andrew Maury Remix)" (feat. Joe Jonas) (2013) (written by Miles Fisher, Robert Schwartzman, Joe Jonas and John Lloyd Taylor)

Music videos

Awards and nominations

See also
Notable alumni of St. Mark's School of Texas

References

External links

Miles Fisher at Yahoo! TV

1983 births
Living people
American male film actors
American male television actors
Male actors from Dallas
Harvard College alumni
Hasty Pudding alumni
Male actors from Washington, D.C.
Musicians from Dallas
Musicians from Washington, D.C.
St. Albans School (Washington, D.C.) alumni
American people of Australian descent
American people of Norwegian descent
American people of South African descent